Aitor "Txiki" Begiristain Mujika (born 12 August 1964) is a Spanish former professional footballer who played mainly as a left winger but also as a forward, currently director of football of English club Manchester City.

He was best known for his spells at Real Sociedad and Barcelona, winning eight major titles with the latter, including four La Liga championships and the 1992 European Cup.

Begiristain represented the Spain national team in one World Cup and one European Championship. He worked as a director of football after retiring, including with Barcelona and also at Manchester City.

Club career

Real Sociedad
Born in Olaberria, Gipuzkoa, Basque Country, Begiristain began his professional career with Real Sociedad in 1982 at the age of 18, being immediately cast into the first-team's setup. After 16 La Liga games in his first season, he became an essential member of the side that was coached by John Toshack, also including Luis Arconada, Roberto López Ufarte, José Mari Bakero and Luis López Rekarte; the highlights of his career at Real included scoring the second goal in the 1987 Copa del Rey final against Atlético Madrid, which was eventually won on penalties after the 2–2 draw.

In the 1987–88 campaign, Begiristain helped his team finish runners-up in both league and cup, losing in both competitions to FC Barcelona. Within a month of the latter he, along with Bakero and López Rekarte, signed for the Catalan club.

Barcelona
Begiristain scored in his league debut for Barcelona, a 2–0 home win over RCD Español, and finished his first year at the Camp Nou with 38 games and 12 goals, adding two in nine matches in the victorious campaign in the UEFA Cup Winners' Cup. Alongside fellow Basque players Bakero, Andoni Zubizarreta, Julio Salinas and Ion Andoni Goikoetxea, he was part of the side dubbed Dream Team, winning numerous honours.

During seven seasons at the club, Begiristain played more than 300 official matches and scored 63 goals in the league, with a career-best 15 in 1992–93 as Barça won the third of four successive titles. Among his best moments were hat-tricks against Real Valladolid in 1991 and Real Zaragoza two years later.

Later years
In 1995, after gradually losing his importance with Barcelona (although he still registered 44 games and 13 goals in the last two seasons combined), Begiristain signed for Deportivo de La Coruña, where he linked up with two past acquaintances, Toshack and López Rekarte. He helped his new team win the Supercopa de España, scoring in the away leg for a 2–1 win against Real Madrid at the Santiago Bernabéu.

During the last season in Galicia, Begiristain only appeared ten times, but scored against CF Extremadura on the final round, granting Depor a third-place finish with the 1–0 win. By this time, he had played in more than 500 competitive matches in his country and surpassed the 100-goal mark.

Begiristain closed out his career in 1999 at 35, after three years with the Urawa Red Diamonds in the Japanese J1 League.

Director
After retiring as a player, Begiristain worked as a commentator for Televisió de Catalunya before becoming director of football at former club Barcelona in 2003. On 28 June 2010, he declared that, with president Joan Laporta leaving, it was the right time for him to part ways with the organisation as well.

Begiristain joined Manchester City of the Premier League on 28 October 2012 in the same capacity. During his tenure the team won the national championship five times, and several of his compatriots were also brought in as well as manager Pep Guardiola.

International career
Begiristain earned 22 caps and scored six goals for Spain, making his debut in a 1–2 defeat to Czechoslovakia on 24 February 1988 in a friendly match played in Málaga. He represented the nation at UEFA Euro 1988 and the 1994 FIFA World Cup, playing his last game in the latter competition, a 3–0 round-of-16 win over Switzerland where he netted the closer from a penalty.

Career statistics

Club

International

International goals

Honours
Real Sociedad
Copa del Rey: 1986–87; runner-up 1987–88
Supercopa de España: 1982

Barcelona
La Liga: 1990–91, 1991–92, 1992–93, 1993–94
Copa del Rey: 1989–90
Supercopa de España: 1991, 1992, 1994; runner-up 1988, 1990, 1993
European Cup: 1991–92
UEFA Cup Winners' Cup: 1988–89
UEFA Super Cup: 1992

Deportivo
Supercopa de España: 1995

Spain U21
UEFA European Under-21 Championship: 1986

See also
List of FC Barcelona players (100+ appearances)
List of La Liga players (400+ appearances)

References

External links

1964 births
Living people
Spanish footballers
Footballers from the Basque Country (autonomous community)
Association football wingers
Association football forwards
La Liga players
Segunda División B players
Real Sociedad B footballers
Real Sociedad footballers
FC Barcelona players
Deportivo de La Coruña players
J1 League players
Urawa Red Diamonds players
Spain under-21 international footballers
Spain under-23 international footballers
Spain international footballers
UEFA Euro 1988 players
1994 FIFA World Cup players
Basque Country international footballers
Spanish expatriate footballers
Expatriate footballers in Japan
Spanish expatriate sportspeople in Japan
FC Barcelona non-playing staff
Manchester City F.C. non-playing staff
Manchester City F.C. directors and chairmen
Spanish expatriate sportspeople in England